Ricardo Cordeiro da Rocha (born 10 July 1965 in São Paulo) is a Brazilian football manager and former player.

External links
 Brazilian FA database

1965 births
Living people
Brazilian footballers
Brazilian football managers
Expatriate football managers in Cape Verde
Cape Verde national football team managers
Footballers from São Paulo
Association footballers not categorized by position
Cape Coast Ebusua Dwarfs F.C. managers
Brazilian expatriate sportspeople in Cape Verde
Brazilian expatriate football managers